Zechariah 13 is the thirteenth of the total 14 chapters in the Book of Zechariah in the Hebrew Bible or the Old Testament of the Christian Bible. This book contains the prophecies attributed to the prophet Zechariah, and is a part of the Book of the Twelve Minor Prophets. This chapter is a part of a section (so-called "Second Zechariah") consisting of Zechariah 9–14. Verses 1–6 may be a part of a section together with 12:1-14, whereas verses 7–9 is a separate part, forming a three-section "entity" with 14:1-21.

Text
The original text was written in the Hebrew language. This chapter is divided into 9 verses.

Textual witnesses
Some early manuscripts containing the text of this chapter in Hebrew are of the Masoretic Text, which includes the Codex Cairensis (from year 895), the Petersburg Codex of the Prophets (916), Aleppo Codex (930), and Codex Leningradensis (1008).

There is also a translation into Koine Greek known as the Septuagint, made in the last few centuries BC. Extant ancient manuscripts of the Septuagint version include Codex Vaticanus (B; B; 4th century), Codex Sinaiticus (S; BHK: S; 4th century), Codex Alexandrinus (A; A; 5th century) and Codex Marchalianus (Q; Q; 6th century).

Idolatry cut off (13:1–6)
These verses attack false prophecy,
remarkably bracketing together 'the prophets and the unclean
spirit'. This section clearly alludes to Amos 7:14 concerning the denial of being a prophet by profession (as opposed to by divine call); also may allude to Deuteronomy 18:20–21 and Jeremiah 23:30–40 about the issue of 'distinguishing between true and false prophecy.'

The smitten Shepherd (13:7–9)
This part follows the previous one to emphasize that as 'the prophets will be unnecessary, the shepherds will also unnecessary in the eschatological future, because God himself will take drastic action to restore his people.

Verse 7
  Awake, O sword, against my shepherd,
 and against the man that is my fellow,
 saith the Lord of hosts:
 smite the shepherd,
 and the sheep shall be scattered:
 and I will turn mine hand upon the little ones.
The medieval French rabbi Rashi interprets "shepherd" as "the one whom [God] appointed over the flock of [His] exile". The Christian gospels pick up this verse, stating that Jesus referred to it in anticipating that his disciples would be scattered following his arrest.

See also
 David
 Jerusalem
Related Bible parts: Ezekiel 5, Hosea 2, Matthew 26, Mark 14

References

Sources

External links

Jewish
Zechariah 13 Hebrew with Parallel English
Zechariah 13 Hebrew with Rashi's Commentary

Christian
Zechariah 13 English Translation with Parallel Latin Vulgate 

13